is a railway station in the city of Yurihonjō, Akita Prefecture,  Japan, operated by JR East.

Lines

Station layout
The station has one side platform and one island platform connected to the station building by a footbridge. The station is staffed.

Platforms

History
Ugo-Kameda Station opened on July 30, 1920 as a station on the Japanese Government Railways (JGR) Rikuusai Line. It was switched to the control of the JGR Uetsu Main Line on April 20, 1924. The JGR became the JNR (Japan National Railway) after World War II. The station has been unattended since October 1981. With the privatization of the JNR on April 1, 1987, the station came under the control of the East Japan Railway Company.

Passenger statistics
In fiscal 2018, the station was used by an average of 60 passengers daily (boarding passengers only).

Surrounding area
Yurihonjo City Hall – Kameda Branch office

See also
List of railway stations in Japan

References

External links

 JR East Station information 

Railway stations in Japan opened in 1920
Railway stations in Akita Prefecture
Uetsu Main Line
Yurihonjō